The Oskil or Oskol is a south-flowing river in Russia and Ukraine. It arises roughly between Kursk and Voronezh and flows south to join the Seversky Donets which flows southeast to join the Don.

The river has its sources on the Central Russian Uplands, and flows through Kursk and Belgorod Oblasts in Russia, and through the eastern part of Kharkiv Oblast in Ukraine, where it joins the Seversky Donets river. An artificial lake, the Oskil Reservoir (Oskil Reservoir, Оскільське водосховище), was created in 1958 to help with flood protection and as a source of electricity.

There are several towns along the Oskil: Stary Oskol, Novy Oskol and Valuyki in Russia, and Kupiansk, Kupiansk-Vuzlovyi, Kivsharivka, Borova and Dvorichna in Ukraine.

On March 31, 2022, during the 2022 Russian invasion of Ukraine, Russian forces destroyed the dam of the Oskil Reservoir. In September of 2022, to resist the 2022 Ukrainian Kharkiv counteroffensive, Russian forces unsuccessfully used the Oskil River as a defensive barrier.

References

External links
 Oskil (Oskil) River in the Encyclopedia of Ukraine vol. 3 (1993)

International rivers of Europe
Rivers of Belgorod Oblast
Rivers of Kursk Oblast
Rivers of Kharkiv Oblast